Hamsanadam (pronounced hamsanādam) is a rāgam in Carnatic music (musical scale of South Indian classical music). It is a pentatonic scale (audava rāgam, which means "of 5"), as it is sung in current days. It is a derived scale (janya rāgam), as it does not have all the seven swaras (musical notes), from the 60th Melakarta rāgam Neetimati.

Structure and Lakshana 

Hamsanadam, as it is sung now-a-days, is a symmetric scale that does not contain gandharam and dhaivatam. It is called an audava rāgam, in Carnatic music classification (as it has 5 notes in both ascending and descending scales). Its ārohaṇa-avarohaṇa structure is as follows (see swaras in Carnatic music for details on below notation and terms):

ārohaṇa : 
avarohaṇa : 

This scale uses the notes shadjam, chatusruti rishabham, prati madhyamam, panchamam and kakali nishadam.

Other structures 
Earlier structure of this scale were as follows:
Ascending scale : 
Descending scale : 

In the above, shatsruti dhaivatam is added in the scale compared to current usage (shadava scale with 6 notes in ascendinga and descending scale), with a vakra prayoga (zig-zag descending scale).

Graha bhedham 
Hamsanadam's notes when shifted using Graha bhedham, yields two pentatonic rāgams, Gambhiranata and Bhupalam. Graha bhedham is the step taken in keeping the relative note frequencies same, while shifting the shadjam to the next note in the rāgam. For more details and illustrations of this concept refer Graha bhedham on Gambhiranata.

Popular compositions 
Hamsanadam has a few popular compositions:

kalyANa rAmA by oottukkADu Sri vEnkaTAkavi
Bantureethi Koluvu by Tyagaraja
Niye Paramukham by Papanasam Sivan
Kripanidhe by Muthiah Bhagavatar
pADa vENDumE by Sri MM Dandapani Desikar
Bharama Ee Baluni by G N Balasubramaniam
Ezhiludai Hamsanaadham by Thanjavur Sankara Iyer

Film Songs

Language:Tamil

Tamil Serial Title Song

Language:Telugu

Notes

References

Janya ragas